Adam Swift (born 1961) is a British political philosopher and sociologist who specialises in debates surrounding liberal egalitarianism. He has published books on communitarianism, on the philosophical aspects of school choice, on social justice, on the ethics of the family, and on how to make education policy, as well as an introduction to contemporary political philosophy.

Family and education
Swift's father was the actor Clive Swift and he was the nephew of David Swift. His mother is novelist Margaret Drabble. He is the brother of British poet and essayist Rebecca Swift and television presenter Joe Swift.

Swift studied PPE at Balliol College, Oxford.  He then did an MPhil in Sociology at Nuffield College, and subsequently became a Fellow of Balliol College. His DPhil was on the topic of "A Sociologically Informed Political Theory".

Career
Swift was the Founding Director of the Oxford Centre for the Study of Social Justice.  Since September 2018, he has been Professor of Political Theory in the Department of Political Science at University College London.

Swift writes for both academic and non-academic audiences, and is an occasional contributor to political debates about education.

Swift is a member of Giving What We Can, a community of people who have pledged to give at least 10% of their income to effective charities.

Books 
 Educational Goods: Values, Evidence and Decision Making (with Harry Brighouse, Helen F. Ladd and Susanna Loeb, (2018)
 Family Values: The Ethics of Parent-Child Relationships (with Harry Brighouse) [2014]
 Political Philosophy: A Beginner’s Guide for Students and Politicians [2001, 4th edition 2019] 
 How Not To Be A Hypocrite: School Choice for the Morally Perplexed Parent [2003]
 Against the Odds? Social Class and Social Justice in Industrial Societies (with Gordon Marshall and Stephen Roberts) [1997]
 Liberals and Communitarians (with Stephen Mulhall) [1992, 2nd edition 1996]

References

External links
Personal Website

1961 births
Living people
British political philosophers
Alumni of Balliol College, Oxford
Alumni of Nuffield College, Oxford
Fellows of Balliol College, Oxford
English Jews
Adam